The following are the national records in speed skating in Spain maintained by Federación Española de Deportes de Hielo (FEDH).

Men

Women

References

External links
FEDH website

National records in speed skating
Records
Speed skating
Speed skating-related lists
Speed skating